Casey Caldwell (née Robertson; born 24 February 1981) is a former rugby union player for . She represented Canterbury and Southland at provincial level. She played prop before switching to number eight, in 38 tests for the Black Ferns, she had played 16 at prop and 22 as a loose forward.

Robertson made her international debut on 13 May 2002 against Germany at Barcelona.

Robertson was part of the  sides that won the 2002, 2006, and 2010 Rugby World Cup's. In July 2013, she was part of the series tour to England. In 2014, she appeared in her fourth World Cup where the Black Ferns finished in their lowest placing of fifth.

References

External links
 Black Ferns profile

1981 births
Living people
New Zealand women's international rugby union players
New Zealand female rugby union players
Rugby union number eights
Place of birth missing (living people)
Canterbury rugby union players
Southland rugby union players